The 1966 Holy Cross Crusaders football team was an American football team that represented the College of the Holy Cross as an independent during the 1966 NCAA University Division football season. Mel Massucco returned for his second year as head coach. The team compiled a record of 6–3–1.

All home games were played at Fitton Field on the Holy Cross campus in Worcester, Massachusetts.

Schedule

Statistical leaders
Statistical leaders for the 1966 Crusaders included: 
 Rushing: Jack Lentz, 685 yards and 7 touchdowns on 177 attempts
 Passing: Jack Lentz, 845 yards, 74 completions and 5 touchdowns on 153 attempts
 Receiving: Pete Kimener, 409 yards and 2 touchdowns on 33 receptions
 Scoring: Jack Lentz, 42 points from 7 touchdowns
 Total offense: Jack Lentz, 1,530 yards (845 passing, 685 rushing)
 All-purpose yards: Jack Lentz, 704 yards (685 rushing, 19 receiving)

References

Holy Cross
Holy Cross Crusaders football seasons
Holy Cross Crusaders football